The Men's time trial of the 2017 UCI Road World Championships is a cycling event that took place on 20 September 2017 in Bergen, Norway. It was the 24th edition of the championship; Tom Dumoulin of the Netherlands won his first title.

Qualification
All National Federations were allowed to enter four riders for the race, with a maximum of two riders to start. In addition to this number, the outgoing World Champion and the current continental champions were also able to take part.

Participating nations
65 cyclists from 41 nations were entered in the men's time trial, although Guyana's sole representative Jermaine Burrowes failed to start. The number of cyclists per nation is shown in parentheses.

 
 
 
 
 
 
 
 
 
 
 
 
 
 
 
  (did not start)

Final classification
All 64 starters completed the -long course.

References

External links
Time trial page at Bergen 2017 website

Men's time trial
UCI Road World Championships – Men's time trial
2017 in men's road cycling